The second season of the American dramatic television series Touched by an Angel ran on CBS from September 23, 1995 to May 18, 1996, spanning 24 episodes. Created by John Masius and produced by Martha Williamson, the series chronicled the cases of two angels, Monica (Roma Downey) and her supervisor Tess (Della Reese), who bring messages from God to various people to help them as they reach a crossroads in their lives. A third angel, Andrew (John Dye) is introduced as the "Angel of Death".

A season set containing all of the episodes of the season was released to Region 1 DVD. The episodes use the song "Walk with You", performed by Reese, as their opening theme.



Episodes

References

External links
 
 
 

Touched by an Angel seasons
1995 American television seasons
1996 American television seasons